Harzbahn includes:
 Rübeland Railway (Rübelandbahn)
 Harz Narrow Gauge Railways
Harz Railway (Harzquerbahn)
Brocken Railway (Brockenbahn)
Selke Valley Railway (Selketalbahn)
 Wurmberg Gondola Lift
 Burgberg Cable Car